Muhammad Ali and Earnie Shavers fought each other in a 15-round boxing match on September 29, 1977. The fight went the distance with Ali winning by unanimous decision.

Background
Shaver was paid one-tenth as much as Ali. However, the $300,000 sum was more than he had earned during his previous career.

The fight
Ali was badly hurt in the second round but, by pretending to be more hurt than he was, deceived Shavers into thinking he was play-acting resulting in Shavers not going for a knockout. Although he spent much of the fight on the defensive, Ali finished most of the rounds strongly, winning favor with the judges. The fight intensified in the final rounds, as Shavers mounted a strong comeback in the 13th and 14th rounds, but Ali finished the 15th round very strongly, nearly knocking Shavers down with a flurry of punches towards the end of the fight. Some experts regard Ali's performance in the Shavers fight to be one of the finest in his boxing career.

Sports Illustrated boxing writer Pat Putnam said:

Undercard
Alfredo Evangelista stopped Pedro Soto with a knockout in Round 8.
Alexis Arguello stopped Jerome Artis with a technical knockout in Round 2.
Mike Rossman outpointed Gary Summerhayes in a 10-round decision.

References

Shavers
1977 in boxing
World Boxing Association heavyweight championship matches
World Boxing Council heavyweight championship matches
September 1977 sports events